Ignacio Warnes is one of the fifteen provinces of the Bolivian Santa Cruz Department and is situated in the department's central parts. The province name honors Colonel Ignacio Warnes (1772–1816), a military leader in the South American war of independence.

Location 
Ignacio Warnes Province is located between 17° 00' and 17° 42' South and between 62° 42' and 63° 14' West. It extends over 85 km from North to South, and 70 km from West to East. Río Piray is forming the province border in the West and Río Grande in the East.

The province is situated in the Bolivian lowlands and borders Obispo Santistevan Province in the Northwest, Sara Province in the West, Andrés Ibáñez Province in the South, and Ñuflo de Chávez Province in the East.

Population 
The population of Ignacio Warnes Province has increased by circa 75% over the recent two decades:
1992: 38,285 inhabitants (census)
2001: 54,593 inhabitants (census)
2005: 60,705 inhabitants (est.)
2010: 67,721 inhabitants (est.)

46.2% of the population are younger than 15 years old. (1992)

The literacy rate of the province is 72.6%.

95.2% of the population speak Spanish, 14.2% speak Quechua, 4.1% Guaraní, and 1.3 speak Aymara. (1992)

41.9% of the population have no access to electricity, 47.9% have no sanitary facilities. (1992)

88.4% of the population are Catholics, 8.8% are Protestants. (1992)

Subdivision 
The province is divided into two municipalities which are further subdivided into cantons. The municipalities with their seats are:

References

External links 
General map of province
Detailed map of province towns and rivers
Population data (Spanish)
Social data (Spanish)

Provinces of Santa Cruz Department (Bolivia)